Maimonides Park (formerly MCU Park and KeySpan Park) is a minor league baseball stadium on the Riegelmann Boardwalk in Coney Island, Brooklyn, New York City.  The home team and primary tenant is the New York Mets-affiliated Brooklyn Cyclones of the South Atlantic League.  The stadium has also hosted other teams as well. The NYU Violets Baseball team began playing at Maimonides Park in 2015, and the New York Cosmos soccer team of the NASL played the 2017 NASL season there. Rugby United New York of Major League Rugby began play in 2019 with MCU Park as its home field.

The official seating capacity at Maimonides Park is 7,000, though the Cyclones sell up to 2,500 more standing-room tickets. Prior to 2016, the capacity was 7,500 plus 2,500 standing room. Features include a concourse with free-standing concession buildings and overhanging fluorescent lamps in different colors, evoking an amusement park atmosphere.  In addition, the park overlooks the Atlantic Ocean as well as the Parachute Jump in right field, and the Wonder Wheel and Coney Island Cyclone in left field.

Site 
Maimonides Park stands on the old site of Steeplechase Park, an old-time Coney Island amusement park that closed in 1964 amid crime and general deterioration of Coney Island and of the subway routes that run to the area.

History 
Part of a general reinvestment in the Coney Island neighborhood, the stadium opened in 2001 as KeySpan Park, which had a capacity of 6,500. The opening of the park, and the Cyclones' permanent move there from their prior temporary home in Queens, marked the return of professional baseball to Brooklyn—albeit on a minor-league level—for the first time since MLB's Brooklyn Dodgers had played their last game at Ebbets Field in 1957 before moving to California the following season. Demand for Cyclones tickets was so great that the team added 1,000 seats in a right-field bleacher pavilion within three weeks after the park opened.

Maimonides Park and the Staten Island Yankees' Richmond County Bank Ballpark were paid for with public money, part of a deal that involved both the Mets and Yankees.  The Yankees had to approve the arrival of the Cyclones, and the Mets had to approve a Yankee farm team in Staten Island. The two teams share MLB territorial rights to the New York City market, and have veto power over each other (and any other MLB organization).

In October 2012, Hurricane Sandy hit Brooklyn and caused extensive damage to the ballpark, including the front office, clubhouses & team store. The entire playing surface, previously a natural grass field, had to be replaced with synthetic FieldTurf before the 2013 season.

Naming rights 
The park's original name was part of a naming rights deal with KeySpan Energy, a utility company whose primary holding is the former Brooklyn Union Gas, until 2020. However, in 2007, KeySpan was acquired by United Kingdom-based National Grid plc, who retired the KeySpan name. On January 29, 2010, the Cyclones announced that they had ended the deal with National Grid, because the KeySpan name no longer existed. On February 4, 2010, it was announced that the Municipal Credit Union, the city's largest credit union, signed an agreement for the ballpark to be called MCU Park in an eleven-year naming rights deal.

In 2021, MCU did not renew the naming rights deal. Maimonides Medical Center became the new sponsor.

Policies 
Maimonides Park prohibits fans from bringing outside food into the stadium, a policy in every minor league stadium, but not in effect at Citi Field and Yankee Stadium.

Baseball

In 2005 and 2014, MCU Park hosted the New York–Penn League All-Star Game.

In early 2015, the New York University Violets moved in and made Maimonides Park their home stadium. In the process, they forced the St. Joseph's College Bears to move out. Baruch College plays a few games at Maimonides Park, as do a few high school teams.

Following the 2015 season, a set of bleachers were removed, removing 500 seats from the ballpark. The area which housed the bleachers was turned into a picnic area.

Maimonides Park hosted a qualifying round for the 2017 World Baseball Classic in September 2016. Israel won the Qualifier over Great Britain, Brazil & Pakistan.

Maimonides Park served as the Mets' alternate training site in 2020 when the COVID-19 pandemic forced the cancellation of the Minor League Baseball campaign and the shortening of the Major League Baseball season.

As part of the restructuring of Minor League Baseball over the 2020–21 offseason, it was announced the Cyclones would continue to operate in the Mets farm system, now their High-A team playing in the new High-A East.

Maimonides Park hosts select games for the New York Crush of the Atlantic Collegiate Baseball League.

Other uses

Soccer
In February 2017, the New York Cosmos officially announced they would host their home games at Maimonides Park for the 2017 NASL season. The Cosmos had previously used Maimonides Park as a home field: once for a regular season match against the Ottawa Fury and once for a post season match against the Fort Lauderdale Strikers, both in 2015. The NASL cancelled its 2018 season, and the Cosmos later announced they will move to Mitchel Athletic Complex in Nassau County for their 2019 home games.

Football
The Brooklyn Bolts played their home games at Maimonides Park during the 2014 and 2015 Fall Experimental Football League seasons before folding. The football field was positioned in the outfield.

Rugby
On August 7, 2018, Rugby United New York announced that it would play its inaugural Major League Rugby season in 2019 at MCU Park. The rugby pitch is laid out predominantly across left and center field, with part of the left side of the infield included.

Concerts

 In 2003, Björk performed two shows at Maimonides Park: on August 22 and August 23. Portions of these concerts appear in the Icelandic music documentary Screaming Masterpiece.
 In summer 2004, the jam band Phish began what was billed as its last tour with a two-night stand at Maimonides Park, with a guest appearance by rapper Jay-Z, a native of Brooklyn, on the second evening. The first concert was simulcast in movie theaters and in 2006, released (along with selected songs from the second night) as a concert album and DVD under the name Phish: Live in Brooklyn. 
 In 2005, the stadium hosted the Across the Narrows Festival along with Richmond County Bank Ballpark. In the same year, The White Stripes performed one of their recent tours following the release of their album Get Behind Me Satan.
 In summer 2005, Def Leppard and Bryan Adams performed at Maimonides Park on July 9 as a part of their efforts to bring major league rock 'n' roll to America's Minor League Baseball parks during their 2005 cross-country "Rock 'N Roll Double-Header" tour.
 On August 9, 2007, the French electronic music duo Daft Punk performed in Maimonides Park during their Alive 2007 Tour.
 On July 16, 2008, 311 and Snoop Dogg played a show together.
 On July 13, 2009, Wilco performed with "very special guests" Yo La Tengo.
 On June 26 and 27, 2010, Furthur, featuring Grateful Dead members Phil Lesh and Bob Weir, performed at the park; they returned to perform again on July 13 and 14, 2012.
 On July 4, 2013, the String Orchestra of Brooklyn  performed music of Dvorak and patriotic favorites as part of an Independence Day celebration with fireworks.

Wrestling
On July 2, 2010, Maimonides Park hosted a live Total Nonstop Action Wrestling house show which also broke the TNA attendance record and became the most attended live TNA house show in the United States to date with a crowd of just under 5,550 fans.

On August 15, 2014, Ring of Honor Wrestling debuted at Maimonides Park with Field of Honor.

On August 22, 2015, Ring of Honor Wrestling returned to Maimonides Park with the second edition of Field of Honor.

On August 27, 2016, Ring of Honor Wrestling returned to Maimondes Park for the third time with Field of Honor.

Other
The ballpark hosted the annual Nathan's Famous Hot Dog Contest on July 4, 2021.  The contest is usually held in a public plaza on Coney Island (at the location of The Original Nathan's Restaurant on the corner of Surf and Stillwell), but, for 2021, was temporarily relocated due to capacity restrictions and other health and safety requirements related to the COVID-19 pandemic. At that event, Joey Chestnut set a world record of 76 hot dogs and buns within 10 minutes.

References

External links

Maimonides Park on Brooklyn Cyclones Web site
Maimonides Park Views – Ball Parks of the Minor Leagues

2001 establishments in New York City
American football venues in New York City
Baseball venues in New York City
Brooklyn Bolts
Brooklyn Cyclones
College baseball venues in the United States
Coney Island
Major League Rugby stadiums
Minor league baseball venues
North American Soccer League stadiums
Rugby union stadiums in New York City
Rugby New York stadiums
Soccer venues in New York City
Sports venues completed in 2001
Sports venues in Brooklyn
Ultimate (sport) venues
NYU Violets baseball
South Atlantic League ballparks